is a Japanese fashion model and former idol. She is an exclusive model for the women's magazine non-no and a former member of the female Japanese idol group Sakurazaka46.

Biography
On August 21, 2015, Watanabe passed the audition for Keyakizaka46 (now Sakurazaka46) and entered the entertainment industry. She was part of the subgroup  along with Rika Watanabe, Akane Moriya, Yūka Sugai and Manaka Shida. As part of the subunit, Watanabe made appearances in three songs: "Aozora Chigau" from Sekai ni wa Ai Shika Nai, "Wareta Sumaho" from Fukyōwaon, and "Namiuchigiwa o Hashiranai ka?" from Kaze ni Fukarete mo.

On October 8, 2016 she made her runway debut at the fashion and music event Girls Award 2016 Autumn/Winter, held at the Yoyogi National Gymnasium.

On March 21, 2017 Watanabe attended the founding 45th anniversary event of the female fashion magazine Non-no, it was announced that she will be the magazine's exclusive model along with Nanaka Matsukawa and Aina Yamada. Watanabe became the first to serve as a magazine exclusive model from Keyakizaka46.

On January 24, 2022, she announced that she will graduate from Sakurazaka46 following the end of promotional activities for the group's 4th single.

Personal life

Risa revealed that one of her friends told her about Toriizaka46 audition so she went with the flow simply because she could and did it with half-hearted feelings at first, not really expecting to pass the first phase of the audition. She had long hair upon joining Keyakizaka46, but before making her debut, her hair was cut by 10 cm or more to make it shorter.

As a child, she has a boyish haircut and she also claimed to only imitate what her older brother does.

She also revealed that she was able to obediently attend her Shichi-Go-San when she was 3 years old however, she refused to go due to her dislike of wearing kimono and being photographed when she was 7 years old. During her junior high school years she joined the volleyball club. Once in high school, she had said to have started dieting by eating bean sprouts she brings to school as substitute for school lunch.

Risa is close with the Japanese actress-model, Yuko Araki.

Among the members, she is close with the Rika Watanabe who comes from the same prefecture and is called W-Watanabe or BeriBeri (べりべり)  by their fans. It is also notable that she is the closest with the now former member, Manaka Shida, as all other members including Keyakitte, Kakenai? MC, Teruyuki Tsuchida, have mentioned that the two are always together. They were known as one of the famous pairs in the group, dubbed as Za Kuuru or The COOL (ザ・クール), ShidaRisa (志田理佐), and MonaRisa (モナリサ).

Hobbies
Watanabe's hobby is shopping. She mentioned her love for looking at transit maps of Japan.

Skills
Her special skills are playing rock–paper–scissors using both hands with the right hand always beating the left hand, riding the unicycle, and using a hula hoop.

It is notable that Risa's athletic skills are among the top of their group. Her 115 cm high jump was recorded as the best during the athletic ability test, her 26m softball putting was just second to Shida Manaka who had 30.5m record, and her 50 meter running record being 7.91 seconds during Kanji's sports battle against Hiragana.

Watanabe is also confident of her culinary skills. She likes cooking omurice and knows how to make sweets.

Discography

Singles
 Keyakizaka46

Sakurazaka46 

Sakamichi AKB

Videos

Filmography

Events

Bibliography

Magazine Serializations

Photobook Release 
On February 4, 2019, it was announced that Risa Watanabe will release her first photo collection. She became the sixth member in Keyakizaka46 to have a photobook, behind Rika Watanabe, Neru Nagahama, Yūka Sugai, Yui Imaizumi, and Yui Kobayashi.

References

External links

 Risa Watanabe promotion webpage at keyakizaka46.com 
 Risa Watanabe Official Blog 
 渡邉 理佐（欅坂46） - SHOWROOM

1998 births
Living people
Japanese female models
Japanese idols
Keyakizaka46 members
Musicians from Ibaraki Prefecture
Sakurazaka46 members